Power Hit Radio may refer to:

 Power Hit Radio (Estonia)
 Power Hit Radio (Lithuania)
 Power Hit Radio (Norway)
 Power Hit Radio (Sweden)